Ctenotus astarte, also known commonly as the stony downs ctenotus,  is a species of skink, a lizard in the family Scincidae. The species is endemic to Australia.

Etymology
The specific name, astarte, is an allusion to Astarte, the goddess of fertility, sexuality, and war in ancient Assyrian mythology.

Geographic range
In Australia, C. astarte is found in southwestern Queensland and extreme northeastern South Australia.

Habitat
The preferred natural habitats of C. astarte are grassland, shrubland, and savanna.

Description

Reproduction
C. astarte is oviparous.

References

Further reading
Cogger HG (2014). Reptiles and Amphibians of Australia, Seventh Edition. Clayton, Victoria, Australia: CSIRO Publishing. xxx + 1,033 pp. .
Czechura GV (1986). "Skinks of the Ctenotus schevilli species group". Memoirs of the Queensland Museum 22 (2): 289–297, Plates 1–2. (Ctenotus astarte, new species, pp. 289–291, Figure 1 + Plate 1, figures C–D).
Wilson S, Swan G (2013). A Complete Guide to Reptiles of Australia, Fourth Edition. Sydney: New Holland Publishers. 522 pp. .

astarte
Reptiles described in 1986
Taxa named by Greg V. Czechura
Astarte